San Pedro Sacatepéquez is the name of two locations in Guatemala:

In Guatemala department:
San Pedro Sacatepéquez, Guatemala
In San Marcos department:
San Pedro Sacatepéquez, San Marcos